Little Women: LA is an American reality television series that debuted on May 27, 2014, on Lifetime. The series chronicles the lives of a group of women with dwarfism living in Los Angeles.

Cast

Episodes

Series overview

Season 1 (2014)

Season 2 (2015)

Season 3 (2015)

Season 4 (2016)

Season 5 (2016)

Season 6 (2017)

Season 7 (2018)

Season 8 (2019)

References

External links
 
 
 
 Tonya Banks Website: http://tonyareneebanks.com

 
2010s American reality television series
2014 American television series debuts
English-language television shows
Lifetime (TV network) original programming
Television shows set in Los Angeles
Television shows about dwarfism
Women in Los Angeles